Ronald Eugene Reynolds (born September 18, 1973) is an American lawyer and politician who is a Democratic member of the Texas House of Representatives representing state District 27. He was first elected in 2010. Reynolds was also an attorney in private practice with the Brown, Brown & Reynolds law firm, but was suspended from the practice of law. He was disbarred on July 29, 2019.    Additionally, Reynolds has served as a Houston Associate Municipal Judge.

In November 2015, Reynolds was convicted on multiple misdemeanor counts under Texas' Barratry & Solicitation of Professional Employment statute. He was fined and sentenced to 365 days in county jail. On November 29, 2017, the El Paso Court of Appeals, hearing the case on transfer from the Beaumont Court of Appeals, affirmed the conviction. On May 23, 2018, the Texas Court of Criminal Appeals refused Reynold's appeal, meaning he will need to serve his year-long jail sentence. Since he was convicted of a misdemeanor, he will continue to hold office during his jail sentence.

References

External links
 
 Ron Reynolds Texas House member page

1973 births
Living people
Texas lawyers
Democratic Party members of the Texas House of Representatives
African-American state legislators in Texas
Texas Southern University alumni
Texas Tech University School of Law alumni
People from Jackson, Tennessee
People from Missouri City, Texas
Texas politicians convicted of crimes
21st-century American politicians
21st-century African-American politicians
20th-century African-American people